Enrico Celeghin (born 22 February 1999) is an Italian professional footballer who plays as a midfielder for  club Triestina on loan from Como.

Career

Como
Following a year-long loan spell with the club, Celeghin moved to Como permanently in June 2019.

On 9 August 2021 he went to Renate on loan.

On 18 January 2023 he went to Triestina on loan.

References

External links

1999 births
Living people
People from Dolo
Sportspeople from the Metropolitan City of Venice
Footballers from Veneto
Italian footballers
Association football midfielders
Serie C players
Serie D players
Serie B players
Como 1907 players
A.C. Renate players
Inter Milan players
Torino F.C. players
U.S. Triestina Calcio 1918 players